The Textile Institute is a professional body for those engaged in clothing, footwear, and textile's whose headquarters are at 8th Floor St James's Buildings, 79 Oxford Street, Manchester, M1 6FQ, UK. The institute was founded in 1910 and incorporated in England by a Royal Charter granted in 1925 and is a registered charity. The Textile Institute works to promote professionalism in textiles and its related industries worldwide.

Membership 

The institute has individual and corporate members in over 60 countries covering all sectors and all disciplines in clothing, footwear and textiles.

Special Interest Groups include:

 Design
 Fashion & Technology
 Sustainability
 Tailoring
 Technical Textiles
 Textiles

Medals and awards 

Under the authority of the TI Council, a number of Medals and Awards are conferred upon individuals and organisations in recognition of their outstanding contribution to the textile industries and/or the work of the Textile Institute itself.

 Companionship of The Textile Institute Membership
 Honorary Fellowship
 Honorary Life Membership
 The Institute Medal
 The Textile Institute Service Medal
 Holden Medal for Education
 Section Service Award
 The Textile Institute Sustainability Award
 The Textile Institute Innovation Award
 The Textile Institute New Materials Award
 The Textile Institute Research Publications Award
 The Textile Institute Young Persons Award

Professional qualifications 

The attainment of a professional qualification is the clearest way of demonstrating possession of a sound knowledge of the industry and a high standard of professional competence. TI professional qualifications are acknowledged by many national governments, as well as by employers establishing that the holder has proved their ability to practice.

Profession qualifications awarded:

 Fellowship CText FTI
 Associateship CText ATI
 Licentiateship LTI

Accreditation and approval 

The Textile Institute accredit a wide range of courses globally within all areas of clothing, footwear and textiles. Students who graduate from these courses can apply for their professional qualifications after a shorter period of work experience and in some cases directly on graduation.

The Textile Institute's brand is the international sign of excellence. Through this scheme the TI can award ‘Approved Status’ to providers of in-house training, short courses, on-line delivery and programmes not otherwise eligible via the accreditation route.

Publications 

Its primary academic journal is the Journal of The Textile Institute, which was established in 1910 published on behalf of The Textile Institute by Taylor & Francis, and the present editor-in-chief is Dr William Oxenham Hon FTI CText ATI Abel C Lineberger Professor & Associate Dean, North Carolina State University, USA.

Textile Progress is published on behalf of The Textile Institute by Taylor & Francis. Textile Progress is a monographic series which, since 1969, has provided critical examinations of the origins and application of developments in the international fibre, textile and apparel industry, and its products. Editor in Chief Prof Richard Murray CompTI CText FTI, Emeritus Professor, Manchester Metropolitan University

textiles is the international membership magazine of The Textile Institute. The magazine covers all aspects of textiles, news and in-depth articles encompassing all areas of the complete supply chain, from fibre production through knit, weave and nonwovens,to fashion, architecture, footwear, medical and automotive products, providing a business and production perspective. International in both readership and outlook, textiles provides a broad industry perspective on issues faces the textile sector, as well as facilitating learning and research. textiles is available in both print and digital formats and is part of The Textile Institute membership package or by subscription.

Textile Terms and Definitions (TT&D), published by The Textile Institute since 1954, is generally regarded as the established, most authoritative and comprehensive English-language reference manual of textile terminology.

The institute works with a number of book publishing partners to communicate essential information about high quality research in all areas of textiles including science, engineering, economics, management, marketing and design.

Events 

A full calendar of events takes place from local section events, a prestigious lunch held at the House of Lords and a major world conference (TIWC) which takes place every 18–24 months at various locations around the world.

Library 

Supported by The Lord Barnby Foundation, the library holds a specialist collection of books and journals. The library is open to the public by appointment.

Arms

References

External links
 
 TT&D
 TI World Conference

Textile industry of the United Kingdom
Professional associations based in the United Kingdom
Organisations based in Manchester
Textile schools
Textile industry associations
1910 establishments in England
Organizations established in 1910